In linear algebra and related areas of mathematics a balanced set, circled set or disk in a vector space (over a field  with an absolute value function ) is a set  such that  for all scalars  satisfying 

The balanced hull or balanced envelope of a set  is the smallest balanced set containing 
The balanced core of a subset  is the largest balanced set contained in 

Balanced sets are ubiquitous in functional analysis because every neighborhood of the origin in every topological vector space (TVS) contains a balanced neighborhood of the origin and every convex neighborhood of the origin contains a balanced convex neighborhood of the origin (even if the TVS is not locally convex). This neighborhood can also be chosen to be an open set or, alternatively, a closed set.

Definition

Let  be a vector space over the field  of real or complex numbers. 

Notation

denote, respectively, the open ball and the closed ball of radius  in the scalar field  centered at  where  and  

Balanced set

Definition:  for all  and all scalars  satisfying 
 for all scalars  satisfying 
 where 

For every  
 If  then the above equality becomes  which is exactly the previous condition for a set to be balanced. Thus,  is balanced if and only if for every   is a balanced set (according to any of the previous defining conditions).
For every  there exists some  such that  or 

If  is a convex set then this list may be extended to include:
 for all scalars  satisfying 

If  then this list may be extended to include:
 is symmetric (meaning ) and

Balanced hull

Definition:  is the smallest (with respect to ) balanced subset of  containing 
 is the intersection of all balanced sets containing

Balanced core

Definition:  is the largest (with respect to ) balanced subset of 
 is the union of all balanced subsets of 
 if  while  if

Examples

The empty set is a balanced set. As is any vector subspace of any (real or complex) vector space. In particular,  is always a balanced set.

Any non-empty set that does not contain the origin is not balanced and furthermore, the balanced core of such a set will equal the empty set. 

Normed and topological vectors spaces

The open and closed balls centered at the origin in a normed vector space are balanced sets. If  is a seminorm (or norm) on a vector space  then for any constant  the set  is balanced.

If  is any subset and  then  is a balanced set. 
In particular, if  is any balanced neighborhood of the origin in a topological vector space  then 

 for some real 
 for some real 
Consequently, both the balanced core and the balanced hull of every set of scalars is equal to one of the sets listed above. 

The balanced sets are  itself, the empty set and the open and closed discs centered at zero. Contrariwise, in the two dimensional Euclidean space there are many more balanced sets: any line segment with midpoint at the origin will do.

Balanced sets in 

Throughout, let  (so  is a vector space over ) and let  is the closed unit ball in  centered at the origin. 

However, 

The balanced hull of a closed set need not be closed.

The next example shows that the balanced hull of a convex set may fail to be convex (however, the convex hull of a balanced set is always balanced).

Sufficient conditions

A set  is balanced if and only if it is equal to its balanced hull  or to its balanced core  in which case all three of these sets are equal: 

The Cartesian product of a family of balanced sets is balanced in the product space of the corresponding vector spaces (over the same field ). 

The balanced hull of a compact (respectively, totally bounded, bounded) set has the same property.
The convex hull of a balanced set is convex and balanced (that is, it is absolutely convex). However, the balanced hull of a convex set may fail to be convex (a counter-example is given above).
Arbitrary unions of balanced sets are balanced, and the same is true of arbitrary intersections of balanced sets.
Scalar multiples and (finite) Minkowski sums of balanced sets are again balanced.
Images and preimages of balanced sets under linear maps are again balanced.

Balanced neighborhoods

In any topological vector space, the closure of a balanced set is balanced. Therefore, the topological interior of a balanced neighborhood of the origin is balanced. However,  is a balanced subset of  that contains the origin  but whose (nonempty) topological interior does not contain the origin and is therefore not a balanced set.

Every neighborhood (respectively, convex neighborhood) of the origin in a topological vector space  contains a balanced (respectively, convex and balanced) open neighborhood of the origin. In fact, the following construction produces such balanced sets. Given  the symmetric set  will be convex (respectively, closed, balanced, bounded, a neighborhood of the origin, an absorbing subset of ) whenever this is true of  It will be a balanced set if  is a star shaped at the origin, which is true, for instance, when  is convex and contains  In particular, if  is a convex neighborhood of the origin then  will be a  convex neighborhood of the origin and so its topological interior will be a balanced convex  neighborhood of the origin.

If  is a topological vector space and if this convex absorbing subset  is also a bounded subset of  then the same will be true of the absorbing disk  in which case  will be a norm and  will form what is known as an auxiliary normed space.

Properties

Properties of balanced sets

A balanced set is not empty if and only if it contains the origin. 
By definition, a set is absolutely convex if and only if it is convex and balanced. 
Every balanced set is star-shaped (at 0) and a symmetric set.
If  is a balanced subset of  then

If  is a balanced subset of  then:
 is absorbing in  if and only if for all  there exists  such that 
for any 1-dimensional vector subspace  of  the set  is convex and balanced. If  is not empty and if  is a 1-dimensional vector subspace of  then  is either  or else it is absorbing in 

Properties of balanced hulls and balanced cores

For any collection  of subsets of 

In any topological vector space, the balanced hull of any open neighborhood of the origin is again open. 

If a set is closed (respectively, convex, absorbing, a neighborhood of the origin) then the same is true of its balanced core.

For any subset  and any scalar  

For any scalar   This equality holds for  if and only if  Thus if  or  then  for every scalar

Related notions

A function  on a real or complex vector space is said to be a  if it satisfies any of the following equivalent conditions: 
 whenever  is a scalar satisfying  and 
 is a balanced set for every non-negative real 
If  is a balanced function then  for every scalar  and vector  
so in particular,  for every unit length scalar  (satisfying ) and every 
Using  shows that every balanced function is a symmetric function.

A real-valued function  is a seminorm if and only if it is a balanced sublinear function.

See also

References

Proofs

Sources
  
  
  
  
  
  
  
  
  
  
  
 
  
  
  

Linear algebra